is a Japanese adult visual novel developed by Neko Neko Soft originally released on July 30, 2004, for the PC. It was followed by an all-ages version for the PlayStation 2, and was released on August 25, 2005. A twelve-episode anime series based on the visual novel, entitled , was produced by Trinet Entertainment and Picture Magic and aired between October 11, 2005, and December 27, 2005. Light novels, drama CDs, and one volume of a manga adaption have also been produced.

Plot 
Kenji Tomosaka moves to a coastal town as a child. The sea spread in front of him shines like ramune, reflecting the sunlight of the summer.

He meets Nanami Konoe, who lives next door. As time passes, their shared memories have accumulated. They think of their normal lives and relationship as precious things.

The sun begins to shine strongly, cicadas begin to buzz, and the sky clears up. For Kenji and Nanami, it is not just another ordinary summer.

Characters

Main characters

 (anime)
Kenji is the male leading character of the story. He is a 2nd year high school student. He and his childhood friend, Nanami, are inseparable; they take turns waking each other, walk to and from school together and tend her family's vegetable field on the outskirts of town. He owns a vintage Triumph motorcycle, passed down to him by his father. He had wanted that motorcycle ever since he was a child, and his father finally decided to give it to him, even though it is always breaking down. Kenji really likes Nanami, however he is too shy to confess his feelings and therefore teases her to hide them.

 (PC)/Yūko Gotō(anime/PS2)
Nanami is the female leading character of the story. She has a long lavender hair. She is Kenji’s childhood best friend, next door neighbor and classmate at school. Her family owns a vegetable field on the outskirts of town which she tends with Kenji's help. She and Kenji take turns waking each other up every morning.
Profile:
Birth date: May 20
Favorite food: Home-grown vegetables
Favorite drink: 100% fruit juice

 (PC)/Mikako Satō(anime/PS2)
She is Kenji's younger light blue-haired sister. Suzuka is a gentle, active and innocent character.
Profile:
Birth date: August 22
Favorite food: Spaghetti with tomato sauce
Favorite drink: Lemon tea

 (PC)/Akane Tomonaga(anime/PS2)
Hikari is Kenji and Suzuka's older cousin. She is short and has a long, golden hair done in twin tails. She is somewhat quick-tempered and is a tomboy. Hikari may be annoying at times but she really cares for her cousins and Nanami, and is willing to help them when they're in trouble. Hatano, Kenji's friend and classmate, is crazy about Hikari and pesters her when she visits her cousins during summer. She loves spicy food.
Profile:
Birth date: March 20
Favorite food: Tom yam kung
Favorite drink: Milk or almost all of carbonated soft drinks

 (PC)/Natsumi Yanase(anime/PS2)
Tae is the Student Council President and Kenji’s senpai in school. She has a short dark purple hair and is often seen wearing her jersey. She is a very mature, good-tempered and responsible person. She has three younger siblings (two brothers and one sister) to take care of.
Profile:
Birth date: February 2
Favorite food: Mitarashidango (a kind of dango)
Favorite drink: Hojicha

 (PC)/Hiroko Taguchi(anime/PS2)
Hiromi is Suzuka's black-haired classmate. She is a soft-spoken and timid girl who has been infatuated with Kenji since childhood. She confesses to him just before she has to move away.
Profile:
Favorite food: Anmitsu, Mitsumame
Favorite drink: Ramune

(anime/PS2)
Misora is a biker girl whose bike, a Honda CB400 SUPER BOL D'OR, breaks down just outside town while she is touring in the countryside. She stays at Kenji's house until the required parts are delivered and works at Nanami's family's cafe to earn the money she needs for the repairs. She has pink hair with a cowlick and two short twin tails.
Profile:
Favorite food: French toast
Favorite drink: Sports drink

Side characters

(anime/PS2)
Kenji’s friend and classmate, Hatano serves as comic relief. He has a crush on Kenji's cousin, Hikari, and tries to make moves on her whenever she visits but is always turned down. He would do anything for her to the point of becoming her slave.

(PC)/Erika Narumi(anime/PS2)
Kagami is Nanami's mother who runs a kissaten or coffee shop right across the street from their house. She has a kind and gentle personality. Because of her youthful appearance, she is often mistaken for Nanami's elder sister.

(anime/PS2)
Kenji and Suzuka’s father who is a judo instructor at Suzuka's school. He is very strict when teaching her and does not accept failure. He is also adamant that Kenji takes care of his motorcycle.

Music (game)
Opening Theme

Performed by: Hiromi Satou
Lyrics by: Tomo Kataoka
Composition and arrangement by: Hitoshi Fujima (Elements Garden)

Ending Theme

Performed by: Duca
Lyrics by: Tomo Kataoka
Composition by: Hijiri Anze
Arrangement by: Katsumichi Harada

Insert Theme (PC)

Performed by: KAKO
Lyrics by: Yanachī
Composition by: Jan Amano
Arrangement by: Takehiro Kawabe

Insert Theme (PS2)

Performed by: KAKO
Lyrics by: Nachi Kio
Composition and arrangement by: Hitoshi Fujima (Elements Garden)

Music (anime)
Opening Theme
: Episodes 01 - 12
Performed by: Mayu
Lyrics by: Tomu
Composition by: Raito
Arrangement by: Yougo Kanno

Ending Theme
"Summer vacation": Episodes 01 - 11
Performed by: Ayumi Murata
Lyrics by: Tomu
Composition and arrangement by: TARAWO
: Episode 12 insert ending theme.
Performed by: Hiromi Satou
Lyrics by: Tomo Kataoka
Composition and arrangement by: Hitoshi Fujima (Elements Garden)

Insert Theme
: Episode 01
Performed by: Tae Isawa (CV: Natsumi Yanase)
Lyrics and composition by: Yuuko Yamaguchi
Arrangement by: Kazuo Satou
: Episodes 03 & 05
Performed by: Suzuka Tomosaka  (CV: Mikako Satou)
Lyrics by: Tomu
Composition by: Nozomu Nakamura
Arrangement by: KANKE
"Kira Kira": Episodes 06 & 10
Performed by: Nanami Konoe  (CV: Yūko Gotō)
Lyrics and composition by: Nozomu Nakamura
Arrangement by: Kazuo Satou
: Episodes 07 & 09
Performed by: Misora Ayukawa (CV: Ryouko Shintani)
Lyrics and composition by: Ritsuko Miyajima
Arrangement by: Fumikazu Takenaka
: Episode 07
Performed by: Hikari Nakazato (CV: Akane Tomonaga)
Lyrics and composition by: Rie
Arrangement by: Yasufumi Yamashita
: Episode 09
Performed by: Hiromi Sakura (CV: Hiroko Taguchi)
Lyrics by: Himi Izutsu
Composition by: YORI
Arrangement by: Yousuke Sugimoto
: Episode 10
Performed by: Tae Isawa (CV: Natsumi Yanase)
Lyrics and composition by: Yuuko Yamaguchi
Arrangement by: Kazuo Satou

DVD
Six DVDs of anime series were released by Interchannel in Japan.
Lamune DVD Vol.1 (Eps. 01 - 02)
Lamune DVD Vol.2 (Eps. 03 - 04)
Lamune DVD Vol.3 (Eps. 05 - 06)
Lamune DVD Vol.4 (Eps. 07 - 08)
Lamune DVD Vol.5 (Eps. 09 - 10)
Lamune DVD Vol.6 (Eps. 11 - 12)

CD Albums
Opening and ending Single albums
Opening theme song Single:  performed by Mayu.
Ending theme song Single: "Summer vacation" (NECM-12104) performed by Ayumi Murata.
Lamune Original Soundtrack Complete Edition composed by Yūko Fukushima.

Character image songs and drama albums

Six character image songs and drama albums were released by Interchannel in Japan.
Lamune Characters Collection Vol.1 Nanami Konoe  (CV: Yuko Gotō) "Kira Kira" (NECM-12113)
Lamune Characters Collection Vol.2 Hikari Nakazato (CV: Akane Tomonaga) 
Lamune Characters Collection Vol.3 Suzuka Tomosaka  (CV: Mikako Satō) 
Lamune Characters Collection Vol.4 Tae Isawa (CV: Natsumi Yanase) 
Lamune Characters Collection Vol.5 Misora Ayukawa (CV: Ryōko Shintani) 
Lamune Characters Collection Vol.6 Hiromi Sakura (CV: Hiroko Taguchi)

Media

Books
One game fanbook for the PS2 version was published by JIVE in Japan.
Lamune ~The Glass Jar that Reflects the Sea~ Visual Guide Book - 
Release date: October 2005

A light novel mainly adapted between episode 07–08, was published by Megami Bunko (Gakken). Written by Takamitsu Kouno, and illustrated by Genichiro Kondo.
Lamune - 
Release date: February 2006

Paradigm has published two 18 prohibited light novels based on the game, the first was published in early November 2004, the second was published in January 2005. both books were written by Okada Runa and illustrated by Ankoromochi. One focuses on Nanami's scenario, and the other focuses on Tae.

Manga
A manga illustrated by Rino Fujii was published in the Japanese manga magazine Comp Ace on Jan 26, 2006, published by Kadokawa Shoten.

Anime
A twelve-episode anime series was produced by Trinet Entertainment and Picture Magic. It is based on the visual novel and is entitled . The anime was directed by Jun Takada, and airs on the networks Chiba TV, Kansai TV, Teletama, Tokai TV, and tvk.

Episode list

Staff
Original Work: Neko Neko Software
Director: Jun Takada
Producer: Yoshihiro Ikeda, Saburo Ōmiya, Takashi Nakanishi
Executive Producer: Masaki Kobayashi, Akira Akamatsu
Series Composition: Takamitsu Kōno
Script: Daisuke Ishibashi, Takamitsu Kōno, Tsutomu Kaneko
Storyboard: Jun Takada, Tetsuya Endo
Episode Director: Jun Takada, Shintaro Itoga
Character Draft: Yūki Osamu, Mochi Ankoro
Character Design: Gen'ichiro Kondo
Composite Director: Atsushi Nakayama
Art Supervision: Tadao Kubota
Color Design: Maki Tanaka
Sound Manager: Kaoru Machida
Sound Producer: Kōichi Izuka
Sound Works: Trinet Entertainment
Music: Yuuko Fukushima
Music Producer: Kazuo Ōnuki
Music Works: Interchannel
Animation Director: Chiyoko Sakamoto, Megumi Noda, Yuka Hasegawa
Animation Producer: Toshirō Sakuma (Picture Magic), Takashi Nomura (Radix Ace Entertainment)
Assistant Producer: Kōsaku Sakamoto (Trinet Entertainment)
Animation Production: Trinet Entertainment, Inc., Picture Magic
Animation Production Assistant: Radix Ace Entertainment Co.,Ltd.

External links
Trinet Entertainment ラムネ Official Website 
Amuse Soft Entertainment ***Anime Corner*** ラムネ 
BANDAI CHANNEL ラムネ 
Interchannel Game ラムネ 
Anime・Game ラムネ 
Lamune|Random Curiosity

Drama anime and manga
Eroge
Megami Bunko
Romance anime and manga
Visual novels
Bishōjo games
Anime series
Seinen manga